Sassnitz is a railway station in the town of Sassnitz, Mecklenburg-Vorpommern, Germany. The station lies on the Stralsund–Sassnitz railway and the train services are operated by Ostdeutsche Eisenbahn GmbH.

Train services
The station is served by the following service(s):

Regional services  Rostock – Velgast – Stralsund – Lietzow – Sassnitz

History 
The station was the destination of Vladimir Lenin's sealed train when he was provided passage through the German Empire by the Foreign Office and the Abteilung IIIb during the Russian Revolution, after which he boarded a ferry across the Baltic Sea for Trelleborg, Sweden, and then a train en route to Finland Station in Petrograd.

References

Railway stations in Mecklenburg-Western Pomerania
Station
Railway stations in Germany opened in 1891
Buildings and structures in Vorpommern-Rügen